Lewis & Clark College is a private liberal arts college in Portland, Oregon. Originally chartered in 1867 as the Albany Collegiate Institute in Albany, Oregon, the college was relocated to Portland in 1938 and in 1942 adopted the name Lewis & Clark College after the Lewis and Clark Expedition. It has three campuses: an undergraduate College of Arts and Sciences, a School of Law, and a Graduate School of Education and Counseling.

Lewis & Clark is a member of the Annapolis Group of colleges with athletic programs competing in the National Collegiate Athletic Association's Division III Northwest Conference. As of Fall 2021, just over 2,000 students attend the undergraduate College of Arts and Sciences, with a student body from 54 countries and 47 U.S. states. The School of Law is best known for its environmental law program.

Today, the three campuses and their supporting offices occupy the  campus, centered on the M. Lloyd Frank Estate on Palatine Hill in the Collins View neighborhood of Southwest Portland.

History

Like many modern universities, the institution that would eventually become Lewis & Clark was initially intended to provide secondary as well as higher education for a specific religious community, in this case Presbyterian pioneers in Oregon's Willamette Valley. The Presbyterian church incorporated Albany Academy in 1858. 

Within a decade of its founding, Albany Academy began to focus more exclusively on higher education, changing its official name to the Albany Collegiate Institution in 1866. Lewis & Clark's official founding date comes from the current charter, which has been legally valid since the Presbyterian church reincorporated the Albany Collegiate Institution as Albany College in 1867. Unlike most Oregon colleges of the pioneer era, the college has been co-educational since the first class, which graduated in 1873. In 1892, the original school building was enlarged, and in 1925 the school relocated south of Albany, where it remained until 1937.

Albany College established a junior college to the north in Portland in 1934, with the entire school moving to Portland in 1939. The former campus grounds later became home to the federal government's Albany Research Center. In 1942 the college trustees acquired the Lloyd Frank (of the historic Portland department store Meier & Frank) "Fir Acres" estate in southwest Portland, and the school name was changed to Lewis & Clark College.

Academics
The three schools of the college include the College of Arts and Sciences (CAS), the Law School, and the Graduate School of Education and Counseling.

CAS major and minor programs include Studio Art, Art History, Biochemistry and Molecular Biology, Biology, Chemistry, Chinese, Classics, Computer Science, Dance, Asian Studies, Economics, English, Environmental Studies, Ethnic Studies, World Languages, French Studies, Gender Studies, Hispanic Studies, History, International Affairs, Japanese, Latin American Studies, Mathematics, Music, Neuroscience, Philosophy, Physics, Political Economy, Political Science, Psychology, Religious Studies, Rhetoric and Media Studies, Russian, Sociology and Anthropology, and Theatre.

Lewis & Clark offers approximately 34 study abroad programs in various countries. Since the 1960s, more than 60% of all Lewis & Clark undergraduates have studied abroad.

Admissions profile
For the Class of 2022 (enrolling Fall 2018), Lewis & Clark received 6,139 applications, admitted 4,528 (73.8%), and enrolled 562 students. For the freshmen who enrolled, the middle 50% range of SAT scores was 1230–1390, the ACT Composite range was 27–31, and the average high school grade point average was 3.90.

Rankings

The 2020 annual ranking of U.S. News & World Report categorizes Lewis & Clark as "more selective" and ranks it tied for the 72nd best liberal arts college in the U.S.; U.S. News & World Report also ranked it tied for 51st in undergraduate teaching and 89th for "Best Value" among liberal arts colleges.  Forbes in 2019 rated it 184th in its America's Top Colleges ranking, which includes 650 military academies, national universities, and liberal arts colleges and 69th among liberal arts colleges. Kiplinger's Personal Finance places Lewis & Clark at 66th in its 2019 ranking of 149 best value liberal arts colleges in the United States.  Money magazine ranked Lewis & Clark 585th out of 744 in its "Best Colleges For Your Money 2019" report.

Campus

Campus overview

Lewis & Clark's  forested campus sits atop Palatine Hill in the Collins View neighborhood of Portland and is contiguous with the  Tryon Creek State Natural Area. Campus buildings include an award-winning environmentally sustainable academic building (John R. Howard Hall), as well as notable historic architecture such as the Frank Manor House (designed by Herman Brookman) and Rogers Hall (formerly Our Lady of Angels convent of The Sisters of St. Francis).

Lewis & Clark was named one of America's top ten "Most Beautiful Campuses" by the Princeton Review,
Travel+Leisure
as well as an independent architecture blog.

Residence halls

All students are required to live on campus for the first two years, unless already a Portland resident, over the age of 21 before the start of the Fall term, are married, or are a transfer student with at least 61 credit hours. 

Most Lewis & Clark College residence halls are co-ed. While individual rooms generally house one gender, students may opt otherwise under the college's gender-neutral housing policy.

Student life

Sustainability

Wind power provides 100% of the college's total electricity, and LEED-"certified" level must be met for all of the college's projects.

Athletics

Lewis & Clark maintains 10 male and 11 female varsity sports teams and athletic facilities including Pamplin Sports Center and Griswold Stadium. Lewis & Clark athletic teams are called the Pioneers, and team colors are orange and black. The Pioneers compete mainly in the Northwest Conference against eight other NCAA Division III institutions in the Pacific Northwest. 17% of undergraduates are officially designated student athletes as of Fall 2021. In the 2011 season, the women's cross-country team placed seventh at West regionals, with the men's team placing 13th. The 2011-2012 men's basketball team lost in the NWC semifinals putting them in 4th place in the conference. Additionally, the women's team of that same year placed second in the NWC and made an appearance in the NCAA DIII National tournament. 

A large number of smaller club and intramural sports such as Rugby and Ultimate Frisbee enjoy broad participation. Lewis & Clark students have invented several intramural competitive sports, including Ninja and Wolvetch, which are popular at Lewis & Clark but seldom played elsewhere. While some varsity athletic events are well attended, there has long been tension between varsity athletes and non-athletes regarding perceived social and cultural differences as well as the substantial financial support varsity sports teams enjoy.

Transportation

Throughout the year the college operates a shuttle bus between campus and downtown Portland, the Pioneer Express (also referred to as the "Pio Express" or just, "the Pio").

Notable faculty, staff, and trustees

 Phillip Barron, philosopher and poet
 John F. Callahan, Morgan S. Odell Professor of Humanities and literary executor of Ralph Ellison's estate
 Rev. Elbert Nevius Condit (1846-1900), Presbyterian minister, early president (1879-?) when it was known as Albany Collegiate Institute.
 Fitzhugh Dodson, Presbyterian minister, psychologist, taught religion
 Bob Gaillard - basketball coach
 Robert B. Pamplin, Jr., entrepreneur, philanthropist, trustee
 Vern Rutsala, poet
 Kim Stafford, writer
 William Stafford, poet
 Anthony Swofford, former adjunct professor of humanities, author of Jarhead
 Mary Szybist, poet
 Edwina Florence Wills, artist and musician

Notable alumni

 Penn Badgley (2004), actor
 Matt Biondi (2000), American swimmer
 Earl Blumenauer (1970, J.D. 1976), U.S. Representative
 Don Bonker (1964), former U.S. Representative
 Kate Brown (1985), 38th Governor of Oregon
Heidi Heitkamp (1983), former U.S. Senator, ND Attorney General, ND Tax Commissioner 
 Larry Campbell (1953), former Speaker of the Oregon House of Representatives
 Ever Carradine (1996), actress
 Ted Gaines (1981), California State Senator, First Senate District
 Gordon Gilkey (1933 from Albany College), artist; Dean of Liberal Arts, Oregon State University; curator of prints and drawings at the Portland Art Museum
 Haben Girma, (2010), disability rights advocate
 Genevieve Gorder (1996), television personality
 Jeanne Holm (1956), former brigadier general in the U.S. Air Force and Major General in the United States armed forces
 Marcia S. Krieger (1975), judge on the United States District Court for the District of Colorado
 Monica Lewinsky (1995), White House intern and party to the Clinton-Lewinsky scandal
 Jake Longstreth (1999), artist and radio personality
 Ronald A. Marks (1978), former CIA official
 Mark V. Olsen, (1977), co-creator of HBO series Big Love
 Markie Post (1975), actress known for Night Court and other TV shows 
Ahmed Ali Al Sayegh (1983), Minister of State in the United Arab Emirates
Quinn Slobodian (2000), Professor of History at Wellesley College and award-winning, internationally published writer
Patti Throop, Miss Oregon of 1954
 Pete Ward (1962), Major League Baseball player

References

External links

Official website
Official athletics website

 
Liberal arts colleges in Oregon
Education in Portland, Oregon
Educational institutions established in 1867
Universities and colleges accredited by the Northwest Commission on Colleges and Universities
1867 establishments in Oregon
Universities and colleges in Portland, Oregon
Private universities and colleges in Oregon